Lo Giudice or LoGiudice is a surname of Italian origin. Notable people with this surname include:

 Jack LoGiudice, American television writer and producer
 Lauren LoGiudice, American artist, writer and creator of sketch comedy characters
 Franco Lo Giudice (1893-1990), Italian operatic tenor

See also
 Giudice (disambiguation)

Italian-language surnames